Diamond Ratna Babu is an Indian film director, who has worked in the Telugu movie industry.  He has directed movies including Burra Katha and Son Of India. The movie 'Son of India' starred Mohan Babu as the hero, and Srikanth, Pragya Jaiswal, Tanikella Bharani, Vijaya Krishna Naresh in other prominent roles. The film was based on a grand theme of patriotism and was released on 18 February 2022. The story revolves around Kadiyam Babji aka Virupaksha (Mohan Babu) who kidnaps people from various professions and Ira (Pragya Jaiswal) an Intelligence officer who takes charge to trace Virupaksha. The Film, however, didn't receive positive reviews. The film was co-produced by Sri Lakshmi Prasanna Pictures and 24 Frames Factory. Diamond Ratna Babu stated that he will be planning a crime thriller movie starring Mohanlal and Manchulakshmi. He also wrote films prior to the direction and made his debut with Sher (2015) and subsequently wrote for films like Luck Unnodu (2017), and Gayatri (2018), a crime drama starring Shriya saran and directed by R. R. Madan.

Filmography

References 

Living people
Telugu film directors
Year of birth missing (living people)
Place of birth missing (living people)